Little Grass Valley may refer to:

 Little Grass Valley Reservoir, an artificial lake in Plumas County, California
 Little Grass Valley, California, census-designated place associated with the lake